Stratiosphecomyia is a genus of flies in the family Stratiomyidae.

Species
Stratiosphecomyia variegata Brunetti, 1913

References

Stratiomyidae
Brachycera genera
Taxa named by Enrico Adelelmo Brunetti
Diptera of Asia